Telfit (Khirbet Telfit or Tilfit) is an Israeli village in the Jenin Governorate in the northern West Bank, located southeast of Jenin. According to the Palestinian Central Bureau of Statistics (PCBS) census, the village had a population of 238 in 2007.  

Situated on an isolated tell in the Zababdeh Valley, Telfit has an elevation of 390 meters above sea level. Nearby localities include Kufeir to the south, Zababdeh to the southwest, Qabatiya to the west, Umm at-Tut to the north, Jalqamus and al-Mughayyir to the northeast and Raba to the southeast. The principal water source is Ein Ginai, 6 kilometers to the west and there are 35 cisterns in the village. In 1980 Telfit's built-up area consisted of 15 dunams.

History
The northern and westerns parts of Telfit contain ruins dating to the Byzantine and Early Islamic periods between the 5th-8th centuries. Ancient building material is used in some of the houses.

Ottoman era
In 1838, during the Ottoman era,  ‘’Telfit’’ was noted as a Muslim village in the Haritheh area, north of Nablus.

The PEF's  Survey of Western Palestine  noted in 1882 that the place (then called "Khurbet Telfit") had modern masonry.

British Mandate era
In the 1922 census of Palestine, conducted  by the British Mandate authorities, Telfit had a population of 43; 24 Muslims and 19 Christians, where the Christians were all Orthodox.  The population increased in the 1931 census to 120;  all Muslim, in  a total of 26 houses.

In the  1945 statistics  the population was 170; all  Muslims, with 6,627 dunams of land, according to an official land and population survey.  194 dunams were used for plantations and irrigable land, 2,726 dunams for cereals, while a total of 3,707 dunams were non-cultivable land.

1948-1967
In the wake of the 1948 Arab–Israeli War and after the 1949 Armistice Agreements, Telfit  came  under Jordanian rule.

post-1967
Since the Six-Day War in 1967, Telfit has been under Israeli occupation.

References

Bibliography

External links
Welcome To Tilfit
Tilfit, Welsome to Palestine
Survey of Western Palestine, Map 12: IAA, Wikimedia commons

Villages in the West Bank